Odia numerals, for the purposes of this article, are the numeral system of the Odia script and a variety of the Hindu–Arabic numeral system. They are used to write the Odia language.

Cardinal numbers
The following table shows Odia cardinal numbers and the Odia word for each of them:

Large Numbers

Ordinals
The following table shows Odia ordinal numbers and the Odia word for each of them:

Fractions

Fraction symbols are obsolete post decimalisation on 1 April 1957.

See also
Odia script
Indian numbering system

References

Odia language
Numerals